The Gq-coupled membrane estrogen receptor (Gq-mER) is a G protein-coupled receptor present in the hypothalamus that has not yet been cloned. It is a membrane-associated receptor that is Gq-coupled to a phospholipase C–protein kinase C–protein kinase A (PLC–PKC–PKA) pathway. The receptor has been implicated in the control of energy homeostasis. Gq-mER is bound and activated by estradiol, and is a putative membrane estrogen receptor (mER). A nonsteroidal diphenylacrylamide derivative, STX, which is structurally related to 4-hydroxytamoxifen (afimoxifene), is an agonist of the receptor with greater potency than estradiol (20-fold higher affinity) that has been discovered. Fulvestrant (ICI-182,780) has been identified as an antagonist of Gq-mER, but is not selective.

See also
 Estrogen receptor
 GPER (GPR30)
 ER-X
 ERx

References

{{DISPLAYTITLE:Gq-mER}}

G protein-coupled receptors
Human proteins